Skymningssagor was a children's programming originally airing over SVT's SVT 1 between 24 October 1988 – 16 November 1998. Every episode includes a story-tale told usually told by silent pictures and narrator. Among the stories were the Sven Nordqvist books about Pettson and Findus. The intro and outro scenes showed a model-landscape with a town and a rural district at twilight, and a model train travelling across model railway tracks. The picture would them zoom in and out the location where the story was set. It was accompanied by a melody played on the piano.

Among the narrators were Nils Eklund, Lennart R. Svensson, Jan Nygren, Lena Söderblom, Anita Ekström and Mikaela Nygren.

References

External links
The programme at SVT's open archive 

Sveriges Television original programming
1988 Swedish television series debuts
1998 Swedish television series endings
Swedish children's television series